The Transnistrian passport is issued to citizens of Transnistria for the purpose of international travel and for the purpose of legal identification within Transnistria.

History
The first Transnistrian passport was issued on 1 October 2001. 

Until then, starting in the mid-1990s, citizens were issued a paper insert in addition to a passport of another state (or a Soviet Union passport, whose design was used from 1974 until its expiration after the fall of the Soviet Union in 1991) indicating the citizen's connection with Transnistria.

Validity 
Transnistria is not recognized by any country of the world (with the exceptions of the unrecognized or partially recognized Abkhazia, South Ossetia, and the Republic of Artsakh), and a Transnistrian passport is not valid for travel to many countries in the world. As dual nationality is permitted, most people affected are entitled to either a Moldovan, Russian or Ukrainian passport for travel abroad.

See also
 Visa requirements for Transnistrian citizens
 Moldovan passport
 Romanian passport
 Russian passport
 Soviet Union passport
 Ukrainian passport

References

External links 

 Law of the PMR "On the PASSPORT OF a CITIZEN OF THE PRIDNESTROVIAN MOLDAVIAN REPUBLIC"
 Law of the PMR "On the PASSPORT of a CITIZEN of the PRIDNESTROVIAN MOLDAVIAN REPUBLIC" as of August 5, 2005 Archived copy from January 8, 2011 on the Wayback Machine

Transnistria
passport